Vera Lynn 100 is a compilation album by English singer Vera Lynn. The album was released on 17 March 2017, by Decca Records, produced by James Morgan and Juliette Pochin to celebrate Lynn's 100th birthday. Some of her best-known songs were re-orchestrated for the album, which features original vocals. The LP features a previously-recorded and hitherto unreleased cover of the Gavin Sutherland-composed "Sailing", and collaborations with singers Alfie Boe, Alexander Armstrong, Aled Jones and Cynthia Erivo.

Commercial performance
The album debuted on the UK Albums Chart at No. 3. As a result of this, Lynn became the oldest living person and first ever centenarian to have an album charting (as she had turned 100 four days prior to the album's release). She supplanted her own previous record set in June 2014 when, at 97, she was the oldest living artist to make the top 20, with National Treasure. The album was blocked from the top spot by Ed Sheeran's ÷ (the album's third week at the top) and Drake's More Life. 
Following the 75th Anniversary of VE Day the album re-entered the UK album chart at number 30, again breaking her own record for the oldest person to chart.

Track listing

Charts

Weekly charts

Year-end charts

Awards and nominations

References

2017 compilation albums
Vera Lynn albums
Decca Records compilation albums